Owens Branch is a  long 2nd order tributary to the Ararat River in Patrick County, Virginia.

Course
Owens Branch rises on the Doe Run Creek divide about 4 miles northwest of The Hollow in Patrick County.  Owens Branch then follows a southerly course to join the Ararat River about 1 mile west of The Hollow, Virginia.

Watershed
Owens Branch drains  of area, receives about 49.3 in/year of precipitation, has a wetness index of 312.67, and is about 62% forested.

See also
List of rivers of Virginia

References

Rivers of Virginia
Rivers of Patrick County, Virginia